The Fawley Challenge Cup is a rowing event for junior boys quadruple sculls at the annual Henley Royal Regatta on the River Thames, at Henley-on-Thames in England open to those who have not attained 18 years of age by 1 September of the year before the regatta and is open to individual crews from boat clubs and schools; an event offered for the first time at the 1992 Regatta.

The trophy presented for this event is the cup given to the Regatta by his family in memory of Nicholas Young who rowed for Westminster School and St Catherine's College, Oxford.

Winners

References

Events at Henley Royal Regatta
Rowing trophies and awards